Benjamin Guggenheim (October 26, 1865 – April 15, 1912) was an American businessman, a wealthy member of the Guggenheim family. He died aboard  when the ship sank in the North Atlantic Ocean. His body was never recovered.

Early life
Guggenheim was born in Philadelphia, Pennsylvania, the fifth of seven sons of the wealthy mining magnate Meyer Guggenheim and Barbara Myers. The first member of his family to enter an institute of higher learning, he entered Columbia College in 1882, matriculating with the class of 1887. However, he found most of his course boring and dropped out after his second year. He also attended the Peirce School of Business (now Peirce College), then one of the most prominent business schools in the country. Guggenheim was Jewish. 
In 1894, he married Florette Seligman (1870–1937), daughter of James Seligman, a senior partner in the firm J. & W. Seligman & Co. and Rosa Seligman, née Content. Her family originated in Baiersdorf, Franconia, Germany. Together, they had three daughters: Benita Rosalind Guggenheim (1895–1927), Marguerite "Peggy" Guggenheim (1898–1979) and Barbara Hazel Guggenheim (1903–1995).

Guggenheim inherited a great deal of money from his mother. Due to business concerns, he grew distant from his wife and was frequently away from their New York City home. He maintained an apartment in Paris, France.

Aboard the Titanic

His ticket was number 17593 and cost £79 4s (other sources give the price as £56 18s 7d). He and Giglio occupied stateroom cabin B84 while Aubart and Sägesser occupied cabin B35. Pernot occupied an unknown cabin in second class.

Guggenheim and Giglio slept through the Titanic encounter with the iceberg only to be awakened just after midnight ship's time by Aubart and Sägesser, who had felt the collision. Sägesser later quoted Giglio as saying, "Never mind, icebergs! What is an iceberg?" Guggenheim was persuaded to awaken and dress, and bedroom steward James Etches helped fit him with a lifebelt and a heavy sweater before sending Guggenheim, Giglio, and the two women up to the boat deck.
Etches later testified that Guggenheim and his valet went from lifeboat to lifeboat ensuring the women and children were safely aboard and that the two were of great assistance to the officers.

As Aubart and Sägesser reluctantly entered Lifeboat No. 9, Guggenheim spoke to the maid in German, saying, "We will soon see each other again! It's just a repair. Tomorrow the Titanic will go on again."  Realizing that the situation was much more serious than he had implied and that he was not going to be rescued, he returned to his cabin with Giglio and the two men changed into evening wear. Titanic survivor Rose Amelie Icard wrote in a letter, "The millionaire Benjamin Guggenheim after having helped the rescue of women and children, got dressed and put a rose at his buttonhole, to die." He was heard to remark, "We've dressed up in our best and are prepared to go down like gentlemen." Etches, who survived the sinking, recorded Guggenheim's message: "If anything should happen to me, tell my wife in New York that I've done my best in doing my duty." Etches reported that "shortly after the last few boats were lowered and I was ordered by the deck officer to man an oar, I waved good-bye to Mr. Guggenheim, and that was the last I saw of him and [Giglio]." Both men, as well as Guggenheim's chauffeur Pernot, died in the sinking. Their bodies, if recovered, were never identified.

Portrayals
Guggenheim was among the most prominent American victims of the disaster. As such, he has been portrayed in numerous films, television series and a Broadway show based on the sinking:

 Camillo Guercio (in an uncredited role) in Titanic (1953)
 Harold Goldblatt in A Night to Remember (1958)
 John Moffatt in SOS Titanic (1979)
 Michael Ensign in Titanic (1997)
 David Eisner in Titanic (2012)

See also
 Guggenheim family

References

External links and references
Encyclopedia Titanica Biography of Benjamin Guggenheim
Benjamin Guggenheim on Titanic-Titanic.com
Encyclopedia Titanica Biography of Emma Sägesser
Titanic: Triumph and Tragedy, by John P. Eaton and Charles A. Haas, W.W. Newton & Company, 2nd edition 1995 
A Night to Remember, by Walter Lord, ed. Nathaniel Hilbreck, Owl Books, rep. 2004, 

1865 births
1912 deaths
19th-century American businesspeople
American people of German-Jewish descent
American people of Swiss-Jewish descent
Deaths on the RMS Titanic
Benjamin Guggenheim
Businesspeople from Philadelphia
Columbia College (New York) alumni
Peirce College people